Snowdrop is a South Korean television series starring Jung Hae-in, Jisoo, Yoo In-na, Jang Seung-jo, Yoon Se-ah, Kim Hye-yoon, and Jung Yoo-jin. It aired on JTBC from December 18, 2021, to January 30, 2022, every Saturday and Sunday at 22:30 (KST) for 16 episodes.

Synopsis
Snowdrop takes place in 1987, a pivotal year in South Korean history that included the June 1987 Democracy Movement, a mass protest movement with the purpose of forcing the dictatorship in South Korea to hold fair elections, and the resulting December 1987 democratic elections, which led to the end of the authoritarian Fifth Republic of Korea and the establishment of the democratic Sixth Republic of Korea.

Snowdrop is set in November and December 1987. Lim Soo-ho (Jung Hae-in) plays a graduate student who is found covered in blood by Eun Yeong-ro (Jisoo), a female university student who hides him from the government in her dorm room. However, it is revealed that Soo-ho is not who he appears to be. Against the backdrop of political upheaval, the pair's story unfolds and the two develop a romantic relationship.

Cast and characters

Main
 Jung Hae-in as Lim Soo-ho (27 years old), formerly named Lee Tae-san, alias Lim Soo-hyeok. He is a North Korean agent with a mission assigned in South Korea. He lives as a graduate student preparing for a master's thesis in the Department of Economics at the University of Berlin. He fell in love with Yeong-ro at first sight.
 Jisoo as Eun Yeong-ro (20 years old), a freshman at Hosu Women's University in the English Literature Department and daughter of Eun Chang-su who is the director of the ANSP. She fell in love with Soo-ho at first sight.
 Yoo In-na as Kang Cheong-ya (34 years old), a charismatic and skilled surgeon at a university hospital. She is later revealed to be a North Korean spy. Her birth name is Kim Eun-hye.
 Jang Seung-jo as Lee Gang-mu (36 years old), the leader of Team One in the Anti-Communist Investigation Bureau, Agency for National Security Planning (ANSP), who seeks to arrest Soo-ho over the death of his colleague. He gets hostage by Soo-ho afterward. Despite their hate for one another, Gang-mu cares for the hostages, especially to Yeong-ro. Though what he didn't know is that he ended up getting betrayed by his own team. So, he and Han-na teamed up with Soo-ho.
 Yoon Se-ah as Pi Seung-hee (43 years old), the housemistress of Hosu Women's University dormitory.
 Kim Hye-yoon as Gye Bun-ok (24 years old), a phone operator at Hosu Women's University dormitory, who could not go to college due to financial issues. She was friends with Yeong-ro but became enemies after claiming her to be the cause of the hostage situation.
 Jung Yoo-jin as Jang Han-na (32 years old), an impulsive, but passionate ANSP agent, who is Gang-mu's junior and fiancée who was left behind six years ago. She allied with Soo-ho after being betrayed by the entire ANSP and her own father.

Supporting

People around Soo-ho
 Kim Min-kyu as Joo Gyeok-chan, a North Korean agent, who is prone to violence. He is later killed by Man-dong. 
 Jang In-sub as Lee Eung-cheol, a North Korean agent, who is trusting and friendly towards Soo-ho. He is killed by Man-dong. 
 Heo Nam-joon as Oh Gwang-tae, a university student who likes Seol-hui.
 Jeon Moo-song as Lim Ji-rok, the Head of United Front Dept., DPRK and Soo-ho's adoptive father, who adopted both Soo-ho and Soo-hui from a coal mine.
 Jung Ae-ri as Choi Soo-ryeon, the Deputy Director of Ministry of State Security, DPRK. She is later revealed to be Soo-ho's biological mother.

People around Yeong-ro
 Huh Joon-ho as Eun Chang-su, the Director of the ANSP and Yeong-ro's father. He truly cares for Yeong-ro despite their strained relationship.
 Kim Jung-nan as Hong Ae-ra, a former film actress, Eun Chang-su's wife and Yeong-ro's stepmother, who has a poor relationship with Yeong-ro.

People around Cheong-ya
 Park Sung-woong as Nam Tae-il, He is the Secretary-General of the Aemin Party and former Director of the ANSP.
 Ariane Desgagnés-Leclerc as Gong Gil-soon, a longtime friend of Kang Cheong-ya posing as ABK Partners fund manager Linda Young.
 Jung Hye-young as Cho Seong-sim, daughter of a four-star general and Nam Tae-il's wife.

People around Yeong-ro, Ms. Pi, and Bun-ok
 Jung Shin-hye as Ko Hye-ryeong, a fourth-year student in the Department of Vocal Music and Yeong-ro's dormmate. Her birth name was Ko Hye-ja before she legally changed her name.
 Kim Mi-soo as Yeo Jeong-min, a fourth-year History major student and Yeong-ro's dormmate, who joined the democratic protests against the authoritarian government.
 Choi Hee-jin as Yoon Seol-hui, a freshman in the Department of Home Management and Yeong-ro's dormmate. She pretends to be a daughter of a rich family when her parents are actually poor.
 Jung Yi-seo as Shin Gyeong-ja, the president of the Dormitory Student Council who frequently sleep walks.
 Ahn Dong-goo as Choi Byung-tae, a military academy cadet who likes Hye-ryeong.
 Kim Jong-soo as Kim Man-dong, a facility manager at Hosu Women's University. He is later revealed to be a North Korean spy.
 Kim Jeong-hoon as Kim Sang-beom, Man-dong's son, who has a gambling addiction.
 Nam Mi-jung as Oh Deok-shim, a chef at Hosu Women's University.

People around Gang-mu and Han-na
 Lee Hwa-ryong as Ahn Gyeong-hui, the Chief of the Anti-Communist Investigation Bureau (ANSP), who is later promoted to the Chief of the Office of Planning and Coordination (ANSP).
 Baek Ji-won as Choi Mi-hye, a fashion designer and Ahn Gyeong-hui's wife.
 Jang Tae-min as Choi Hui-jun, Eun Chang-su's secretary.
 Moon Yoo-kang as Seung-jun, a member of the ANSP team.
 Choi Kyung-hoon as Oh Dong-jae, a member of the ANSP team.
 Choi Yoon-je as a member of the ANSP team.

Others
 Park Ye-ni as Kim Ye-ni, a secretary at ‘Charmant’.
 Kwon Han-sol as Han-na
 Lee Joo-ahn as Jun-pyo, the son of the President of South Korea.
 Kang Moon-kyung as Park Moo-yeol, a presidential candidate and member of Aemin Party.

Cameos
 Lee Jung-hyun as Park Geum-cheol, a North Korean agent and Soo-ho's colleague, who committed suicide upon his arrest by Gang-mu. (Eps. 1 - 2, 12)
 Song Geon-hee as Eun Yeong-u, Yeong-ro's brother, was forcibly sent into the military by his father after his involvement in the democratic protests was discovered. During a military operation he switched places with a fellow soldier and was killed during the engagement at the West Sea. (Eps. 2, 5 - 6, 8)
 Chae Won-bin as Lim Soo-hui, Soo-ho's younger sister. (Ep. 10)
 Yum Jung-ah as Song Hye-joo, the former housemother of Hosu Women's University dormitory. She was believed to have committed suicide  but it was later revealed that Man-dong had killed her as she had found out his secret identity as a North Korean spy.

Episodes

Production

Development
Written by Yoo Hyun-mi and directed by Jo Hyun-tak, Snowdrop is their second collaboration after having worked together on the hit satirical thriller Sky Castle (2018–19). Based on the memoirs of a man who escaped a political prison camp in North Korea, Yoo Hyun-mi had been planning the series for twelve years. The early working title of the series was Leehwa Women's University Dormitory.

Casting
On June 18, 2020, media reported that Kim Hye-yoon, who was propelled to fame after starring in Sky Castle, was in talks to star in the series; her agency confirmed that she was reviewing the offer. On August 18, reports of Jisoo being cast as one of the lead actresses for the series surfaced. It was confirmed later that day by Jisoo's agency, YG Entertainment. On August 24, Kim Hye-yoon was confirmed to co-star alongside Jisoo and it was reported that Jung Hae-in had received an offer but was still reviewing it. Jang Seung-jo officially joined the cast on August 26, followed by Jung Yoo-jin on September 17 and Yoon Se-ah on September 18. On October 5, 2020, the main cast and details on the characters were confirmed by JTBC. Yoo In-na officially joined the cast on December 28.

Filming
On November 24, 2020, JTBC announced that filming for Snowdrop was temporarily halted after a supporting actor came into close contact with someone who tested positive for COVID-19. The following day, JTBC confirmed that filming would resume after all cast and crew members tested negative for the virus. Filming was completed in late July 2021.

Original soundtrack

The following is the official track list of Snowdrop (Original Television Soundtrack) album. Singles included on the album were released from December 18, 2021, to January 22, 2022.

Viewership

Television

Streaming
The episodes of Snowdrop were released weekly on Disney+ in Asia-Pacific regions simultaneously with the television airings. On January 4, NME reported that Snowdrop was ranked first among the most-watched series on Disney+ in Singapore, South Korea, Hong Kong, and Taiwan. In Japan, the program was the third most-watched series on the streaming platform, behind Hawkeye and The Book of Boba Fett. The series later premiered on February 9, 2022, on Disney+ in the United States, Canada and Europe while in Latin America it was released on Star+ and on Hotstar in India. The series also premiered in the Philippines on November 17, 2022 when Disney+ launched in the country.

Controversy

Pre-release
Snowdrop became the subject of controversy due to accusations of historical negationism. In March 2021, parts of the synopsis and character profiles were leaked online which revealed that the male protagonist is actually a North Korean spy posing as a pro-democracy student activist who infiltrates South Korea to instigate chaos and political instability. The premise drew backlash from South Korean netizens due to the drama being purportedly set against the backdrop of the 1987 June Struggle peaceful mass protest movement that had led to the establishment of democracy in South Korea. Netizens pointed out that the revelation of the male protagonist as a North Korean spy invokes false claims made by the authoritarian Chun Doo-hwan administration against pro-democracy activists that framed them as North Korean spies. Netizens also criticized the character Lee Kang-moo, a fictional agent of the real-life Agency for National Security Planning (ANSP) which served as the intelligence agency of the Chun dictatorship, being purportedly portrayed as just and righteous despite numerous human rights abuses committed by the ANSP.

On March 26, JTBC released their first official statement on the controversy that read, "The drama is not distorting the pro-democracy movement nor is it glorifying the Agency for National Security Planning. It is a black comedy drama satirizing the political situation between the two Koreas under the authoritarian government in the 1980s. Also, it is a romance drama showing young people who sacrifice their love." On March 30, JTBC released a second statement regarding the controversy that read, "Snowdrop is set around the 1987 presidential election, and not a drama that deals with the pro-democracy movement". The statement continued, "The drama portrays a fictional story about the military regime, the ANSP, and others in power at the time colluding with the North Korean dictatorship and planning a conspiracy to retain their power." Regarding the character Lee Kang-moo, who is an agent of the ANSP, the statement read, "The character is portrayed as a man of principle who turns his back on the corrupt organization and does what he thinks is right." The name of the female protagonist at the time, Eun Young-cho, had drawn scrutiny, as the given name "Young-cho" bore similarity to the name of real-life pro-democracy activist Chun Young-cho. The statement denied that the name of the female protagonist character was in reference to Chun Young-cho, but confirmed that the character's name would be changed.

On March 30, protesters parked a truck bearing protest signs at the site of the JTBC building in Seoul.

In the period from March 26 to April 25, a total of 226,078 people signed an online petition to the Blue House demanding that production on Snowdrop be stopped. The petition was started shortly after the cancellation of the SBS drama Joseon Exorcist due to accusations of historical negationism. On May 14, the Blue House issued an official response to the petition, rejecting the calls for the show's cancellation. The response stated that the Blue House did not intend to interfere in the production of Snowdrop, citing the protection of freedom of expression in South Korea's Broadcasting Law, which guarantees broadcasters' independence and prohibits extrajudicial regulation or interference. They recognized JTBC's previous statements about the drama plot. The response stated, however, that the Blue House was continuing to monitor the controversy, stating that "programming that violates broadcasting responsibilities, such as through excessive historical negationism or violation of regulations, are liable for a review by the Korea Communications Standards Commission," and that the Korea Communications Standards Commission would watch over the broadcasts.

Post-release
On December 18, 2021, the first episode of Snowdrop aired. On December 19, a new online petition to the Blue House was filed demanding that the airing of the drama be suspended. In a few hours over 80,000 people had signed the petition, and over 200,000 people had signed the petition by the end of the day. The petition reached 300,000 signatures by December 21. By December 22, there were at least 30 active petitions to the Blue House demanding the cancellation of the drama's broadcast. On December 24, a separate online petition to the Blue House was filed demanding the shutdown of JTBC for its "unconstitutional drama", which reached 30,000 signatures on its first day.

By December 21, around 3,000 requests to cancel Snowdrop were posted to JTBC's website and around 740 complaints were made to the Korea Communications Standards Commission regarding the drama. On December 21, an official citizen complaint was filed with South Korea's Anti-Corruption and Civil Rights Commission against Snowdrops screenwriter Yoo Hyun-mi and director Jo Hyun-tak for violating the National Security Act. The World Citizen Declaration, a youth civic nonprofit that supports citizens resisting government violence, filed an injunction in the Seoul Western District Court to halt the broadcast of Snowdrop on December 22. That same day, Head of JTBC Studios Jung Kyeong-moon held a meeting with The World Citizen Declaration in which JTBC Studios reiterated that it did not intend to distort history. The Seoul Western District Court dismissed The World Citizen Declaration's lawsuit on December 29, finding in its decision that even if there was distortion of history in the plot, there was insufficient evidence to show the infringement of the group's civil rights or that the drama's audience may blindly accept the historical content as genuine.

Advertisers such as TEAZEN, Ssarijai, Heung Il Furniture, Ganisong, P&J Group, and Han's Electronics announced they were pulling advertisements from the broadcast of the show and issued apologies. Daegu University, where Snowdrop was filmed, stated that it requested the name of the university be taken off of the drama's credits.

Memorial institutions of student activists Bak Jong-cheol and Lee Han-yeol, whose deaths became key inciting events of the 1987 June Struggle, have criticized Snowdrop. The Bak Jong-cheol Memorial Foundation spoke out against the drama, calling it a "disparagement of the democratization movement" and "a drama with an obvious intention to distort." The Lee Han-yeol Memorial Museum also called on the drama to be cancelled. JTBC Studios attempted to arrange a meeting with a representative of the Bak Jong-cheol Memorial Foundation, but its efforts were unsuccessful.

On December 21, JTBC released their official statement on the controversy that read, "The background and motif for important incidents in Snowdrop are the time of military regime. With this background, it contains a fictional story of the party in power colluding with the North Korean government in order to maintain authority. Snowdrop is a creative work that shows the personal stories of individuals who were used and victimized by those in power. There is no spy who leads the democratization movement in Snowdrop. The male and female leads were not shown as participating in or leading the democratization movement in episodes 1 and 2, and they do not do so in any part of the future script." The statement continued, "Most of the misunderstandings regarding concerns of historical negationism and disparaging the democratization movement will be settled through the progress of the drama's plot. The drama includes the production team's intent of hoping for no repetition of an abnormal era in which individual freedom and happiness are oppressed by unjust power. Although we unfortunately cannot reveal much of the plot ahead of each episode, we ask that you watch over the future progress of the plot." JTBC stated their intention to listen to their official website's real-time chat and viewer message board.

JTBC hastened the broadcasting schedule of Snowdrop and aired episodes 3, 4, and 5 on December 24, 25 and 26 respectively, with the stated intention to quickly resolve misunderstandings from the beginning of the drama. JTBC stated that episodes 3–5 were released quickly because they explained the backstory of the character Soo-ho and revealed collusion between the ANSP and the North Korean government in the drama's story.

On December 23, Sim Sang-jung, 2022 presidential candidate of the Justice Party spoke out against the drama, stating, "If we are going to shine a light in a harsh era, the protagonist should be our ordinary citizens who shed blood, sweat and tears for the democracy of the Republic of Korea, not the security guards and spies of the South faction under the dictatorship." She also said that "creative freedom should be humble when faced with of the scars of history."

Defenders of Snowdrop have pointed to respect that must be given to freedom of expression. On his Facebook page, film director Jeong Yoon-cheol expressed his belief that censoring the drama's broadcast would be dictatorial in and of itself, and cited the films Hiroshima mon amour and The Lives of Others as positive examples of similar love stories that include individuals of objectionable political backgrounds. Political commentator Chin Jung-kwon called on the public to "just watch the drama as a drama."

On December 30, JTBC issued a last statement regarding the controversy around Snowdrop. The broadcasting station stated that JTBC is experiencing severe damages due to the spread of false and malicious comments regarding Snowdrop. JTBC considers the freedom and independence of creativity a key component of successful content creation, as much as they respect the rights of consumers to freely criticize or form opinions about content to a healthy extent. However, "against comments and rumors which openly terrorize those involved in the making of the drama and which have nothing to do with the story's actual content", JTBC plans to proceed with strict legal actions in order to protect the broadcasting station's image as well as the image of the drama's creators and the rights of creative content. JTBC then continued, "the synopsis of Snowdrop was leaked in the early stages of production, malicious narratives that falsified the plot were circulated continuously and repeatedly. Even to this day the spreading of false information and baseless accusations regarding the drama's content are swaying the public's opinions severely."

On March 30, 2022, Korea Communication Standards Commission investigation results revealed, from the first episode to the final episode, Snowdrop did not "distort history" or denigrate "democratization movement." Korea Communications Standards Commission has concluded that the drama was uncontroversial to the extent that it was not even a matter to be discussed in the Broadcasting Subcommittee.

On April 7, JTBC said in a phone call with the newspaper company, Money Today News, they had filed the criminal complaint against netizens for defamation. The first netizen Mr. A said, "I was sued by JTBC and Drama House through the above post." JTBC official explained, "Due to the negative public opinions there was a lot of damage done to the production company, team, and actors. We sued them for continuously stating false info different from the actual drama." When asked how many people were sued, they answered, "It's hard to say since it's an ongoing issue."

Notes

References

External links
  
 
 

JTBC television dramas
Korean-language television shows
2021 South Korean television series debuts
2022 South Korean television series endings
South Korean black comedy television series
South Korean romance television series
South Korean melodrama television series
Television series set in 1987
Television shows set in Seoul
North Korea in fiction
Works about North Korea–South Korea relations
2020s college television series
South Korean college television series
National Intelligence Service (South Korea) in fiction
Television series by Drama House
Television series by JTBC Studios
Television productions suspended due to the COVID-19 pandemic
Hostage taking in fiction